Michael Raczka (born November 16, 1962) is a former Major League Baseball pitcher. Raczka played for the Oakland Athletics in the  season.

Amateur career
A native of New Britain, Connecticut, Raczka attended the University of New Haven. In 1982 and 1983, he played collegiate summer baseball in the Cape Cod Baseball League for the Yarmouth-Dennis Red Sox. He was selected by the Baltimore Orioles in the 5th round of the 1984 amateur draft.

Professional career
Raczka made his major league debut for Oakland on August 15, 1992. He appeared in eight games for the Athletics that season, his only major league campaign.

References

External links

1962 births
Living people
Major League Baseball pitchers
Baseball players from Connecticut
Oakland Athletics players
Yarmouth–Dennis Red Sox players
Hagerstown Suns players
Sportspeople from New Britain, Connecticut
American people of Polish descent
Charlotte Knights players
Charlotte O's players
Las Vegas Stars (baseball) players
Louisville Redbirds players
Modesto A's players
New Britain Red Sox players
New Haven Chargers baseball players
Pawtucket Red Sox players
Rochester Red Wings players
Tacoma Tigers players